Greatest Hits is the first greatest hits compilation by American country music band Diamond Rio. The tracks "How Your Love Makes Me Feel" and "Imagine That" are new to this compilation, and both were released as singles. All of the other tracks from this album are reprised from the band's first four albums.

Track listing

Personnel 
Gene Johnson – mandolin, background vocals
Jimmy Olander – acoustic guitar, electric guitar
Brian Prout – drums
Marty Roe – acoustic guitar, lead vocals
Dan Truman – keyboards
Dana Williams – bass guitar, background vocals

Charts

Weekly charts

Year-end charts

Certifications

References

1997 greatest hits albums
Diamond Rio albums
Arista Records compilation albums